Hellmuth Weiss (23 October 1900 Tallinn – 10 April 1992 Marburg, Germany) was a Baltic-German historian and politician, activist of the German minority in Estonia. He was a member of Estonian National Assembly.

References

1900 births
1992 deaths
Baltic-German people
20th-century German historians
Members of the Estonian National Assembly
German politicians
Nazi Party members
Politicians from Tallinn
Estonian emigrants to Germany